A klobuk is an item of monastic clothing worn by monks and, in the Russian tradition, also by nuns, in the Byzantine Rite, composed of a kamilavka (stiffened round black headcovering) with an epanokamelavkion, a veil which completely covers the kamilavka and hangs down over the shoulders and back.

Overview
In the Greek tradition, the epanokamelavkion is simply laid over the kamilavka and allowed to hang freely, but in the Russian tradition they are permanently attached.

Tonsured monastics always wear a klobuk in church and the refectory and whenever else formally dressed. During the services, there are specified times when monks are to remove the klobuk and lay it on their left shoulder to denote reverence for the sacred , e.g., when the deacon brings the chalice out through the holy doors for Holy Communion. Nuns do not normally remove the klobuk at any time during services.

In the Russian tradition Archbishops and Metropolitans usually wear a small jewelled cross on the front of their klobuk as a mark of their rank. Metropolitans wear a klobuk that is white rather than black.

The patriarchs of Romania and Serbia also wear a white klobuk.

The patriarchs of Moscow and Georgia wear an archaic form of klobuk that is rounded on top, and the former's is white, embroidered, and surmounted with a cross.

Patriarchs and bishops of the Coptic Catholic and Armenian Catholic churches wear klobuks as well, although it is not a headgear worn by their Oriental Orthodox counterparts. Red klobuks have been worn by a Coptic Catholic patriarch, an Armenian Catholic catholicos, and a Ukrainian Catholic major archbishop after being elevated to the cardinalate. A purple klobuk has been used by a Ukrainian Catholic bishop.

See also 
Koukoulion
Skufia
Apostolnik

Footnotes

References

Sources

External photos

Russian monk wearking klobuk (side view).
Metropolitan (St. Joseph of Petrograd) in white klobuk.

Hats
Headgear
Eastern Christian vestments
Christian monasticism